Eva Ingolf  is a well known Icelandic violinist particularly recognized for her authoritative performances of solo works by J. S. Bach. She comes from a leading musical family and her father, Ingólfur Guðbrandsson, premiered many of the great choral works in Iceland and six of her sisters and brothers are professional musicians who have made an important contribution to the high quality of the musical life in the country.
Eva Ingolf currently lives in New York City with her husband Kristinn Sv. Helgason, an official of the United Nations Secretariat and their daughter, Andrea Kristinsdóttir, a musician and actress.

Education

She began violin studies at a young age, gaining early recognition for outstanding musical talent, including the beautiful tone and artistic interpretation of her playing. After studying at the Conservatory of Reykjavík for 6 years, Eva left Iceland to study with some of Europe’s finest violin pedagogues. Her playing has been greatly influenced by the spirit of the Russian and East-European violin schools. At the Royal Conservatory of Brussels, she was a student of Prof. Leon-Ara, followed by studies with Prof. Corrado Romano at the Conservatory of Geneva and Prof. Istvan Parkanyi at the Sweelink Conservatory in Amsterdam During these years she won many awards, as well as scholarships to study with world-renowned pedagogues such as Stephan Gheorghiu, Victor Pikaizen, Zachar Bron and Tibor Varga.

Career

Throughout her career, Eva has given numerous solo recitals in well-known concert halls in Iceland, Japan, United States, Russia and Europe, including regularly at the Weill Recital Hall at Carnegie Hall, the Trinity Church in New York City and the Corcoran Gallery of Art in Washington, D.C., receiving high acclaim from music critics as well as the general public. She has released two highly regarded CDs on the Japis label. Eva has also recorded for the Icelandic State Radio. In 1995-1996, she undertook studies in composition, conducting and orchestration at Harvard University.
Eva has received grants from NYWC IN 2014, as well as American Scandinavian Society in 2015

Instrument

Eva plays on a violin made by Matteo Goffriller in 1720, formerly the concert instrument of the well-known Russian violinist, Dmitri Tsyganov, leader of the legendary Beethoven Quartet, which premiered many of the works by Shostakovich, Prokofief and other leading Russian composers

References 

Icelandic Violinist Eva Ingolf at Carnegie Hall  Iceland Naturally

External links 
 :is:Ingólfur Guðbrandsson Ingólfur Guðbrandsson
  Consulate General of Iceland - New York, USA
  Carnegie Hall - New York, USA

Icelandic violinists
Living people
21st-century violinists
Year of birth missing (living people)